Bernie Ruoff (born October 12, 1951) is a former punter and placekicker for the Winnipeg Blue Bombers from 1975 to 1979 and the Hamilton Tiger-Cats from 1980 to 1987 of the Canadian Football League. He finished his CFL career in 1988, playing 5 games for the British Columbia Lions.  Ruoff scored 1,772 points in 14 seasons in the CFL and is one of the leading scorers in league history.  He also holds CFL records for the most punts in one game (22 in 1984), and most punting yards in one game (1,054 in 1984).  He attended college at Syracuse University, where he played for Hall of Fame coach Ben Schwartzwalder. He attended Cameron Heights Collegiate School.

Ruoff also played for one season in the Arena Football League as a member of the Providence, Rhode Island-based New England Steamrollers in the summer of 1988.

References

1951 births
Syracuse Orange football players
Winnipeg Blue Bombers players
Hamilton Tiger-Cats players
BC Lions players
Canadian football punters
Canadian football placekickers
Living people
New England Steamrollers players